Fabio Sani (born 1961) is a professor of social and health psychology at the University of Dundee, in Scotland.

Education 
Sani completed his undergraduate degree in Pedagogy at the University of Florence in 1986. Subsequently, he obtained a Master of Science degree in social psychology at the London School of Economics in 1991, and his PhD in psychology at the University of Exeter in 1995, with a research project on schisms within social groups supervised by Steve Reicher.

Career and research
After spending one year working as a postdoctoral research fellow at the University of Surrey, he moved to the University of Dundee in 1996. He has held visiting positions at the Australian National University (2000), the University of Bari (2002), the University of Pittsburgh (2004), and the University of Queensland (2014).

Sani's research mainly concerns group psychology, social identity, and the psycho-social determinants of health and illness. He has explored issues of schisms in religious and political groups, perceptions of historical and cultural continuity among members of ethnic and national groups, and the development of social identity in children and adolescents. In recent years, Sani's research has focused on group identification and health. More specifically, he is investigating the extent to which one's subjective sense of identification with groups such as the family, the community, and the workplace impacts upon mental and physical health. He was the Principal Investigator on the Health in Groups Project, a cross-national and longitudinal study investigating the effects of group life on various health indicators, funded by the Economic and Social Research Council (ESRC) of the UK.

Sani has published numerous scientific articles, and co-authored and edited four books, including a social psychology textbook published by McGraw-Hill. He has been an associate editor of the European Journal of Social Psychology.

Publications 

 
  (Greek translation published by Πεδίο, in 2009; Korean translation published by Si Geumapeureseu in 2011).

References

1961 births
Scottish psychologists
Social psychologists
Alumni of the University of Exeter
Living people
Academics of the University of Dundee